Wan Shing is one of the 38 constituencies in the Sha Tin District in Hong Kong.

The constituency returns one district councillor to the Sha Tin District Council, with an election every four years.

Wan Shing constituency is loosely based on part of the Holford Gardens, Festival City and Carado Garden in Tai Wai with an estimated population of 20,104.

The Chinese name of the constituency, 雲城, is based on the Chinese names of Carado Garden (雲疊花園) and Festival City (名城).

Councillors represented

Election results

2010s

References

Tai Wai
Constituencies of Hong Kong
Constituencies of Sha Tin District Council
2015 establishments in Hong Kong
Constituencies established in 2015